The Slipper Hero is a 1923 Austrian-German silent comedy film directed by Reinhold Schünzel and starring Scott van Balen, Liane Haid and Paul Hartmann. The title is an expression for a hen-pecked husband.

The film's sets were designed by the art director Oscar Friedrich Werndorff.

Cast
Liane Haid
Reinhold Schünzel
Paul Hartmann
Else Fischer
Liesl Stillmark

References

External links

Films of the Weimar Republic
German silent feature films
Films directed by Reinhold Schünzel
German comedy films
Austrian comedy films
1923 comedy films
German black-and-white films
Silent comedy films
1920s German films